Louis Rollet (6e arrondissement, Paris, 3 May 1895 - Saché, 1988) was a French painter of the school of "peintres voyageurs" of the early 20th Century. He made many journeys in Asia and Africa and was particularly influential on local artists during his stay in Madagascar, more so than his compatriot Maurice Le Scouézec (1881-1940).

References

20th-century French painters
20th-century French male artists
French male painters
1895 births
1988 deaths